Jim Betts is a former member of the Ohio House of Representatives. He ran against incumbent U.S. Senator John Glenn in 1980. He lost and ran in 1982 for lieutenant governor.

References

Republican Party members of the Ohio House of Representatives
Cleveland–Marshall College of Law alumni
Ohio University alumni
Living people
1930s births
Year of birth uncertain